St Andrew's Prep (officially St Andrew's Preparatory School) is an independent boarding and day school for boys and girls aged 9 months to 13 years in Meads, Eastbourne, East Sussex on the south coast of England. The school was founded in 1877 by the Reverend Francis Souper as a boys' boarding preparatory school. In 1964, the school began admitting day boys, and in 1976, girls. In 2010, the school became part of the Eastbourne College Charity.

History 
In 1865, the Colstocks Farm, then on the South Downs, was bought by a Mr Goodwin, who was to found the first school on the site. In 1877 the Reverend Francis Souper came to Eastbourne with his wife and family. He bought Colstocks Farm from Mr Goodwin and called the school ‘Meads’ until 1882, when he decided to name it after St Andrew, the disciple whom Jesus had first met by the sea.’

Houses 
The original St Andrew's house system was established in 1904 by headmaster E. L. Browne. He divided the children into 'sets' and those sets were named after the teachers who led them. The names of these houses are still used today. Every pupil and member of staff is a member of a set.

References

External links 

 St Andrew's Prep website
 St Andrew's Prep in the Good Schools Guide
 St Andrew's Prep ISI inspection records

Preparatory schools in East Sussex
1877 establishments in England
Educational institutions established in 1877
Buildings and structures in Eastbourne